Clarissa Tucker Tracy (November 12, 1818 – November 13, 1905) was an American botanist.

Life
Tracy was born in Jackson, Susquehanna County, Pennsylvania, daughter of pioneer Stephen Tucker and Lucy Tucker (née Harris).

When she was three she started attending local schools, and by about 1832 was teaching, while she continued her studies.  From 1835 to 1840 she was both student and teacher at the Franklin Academy in Harford.  In 1840 she became assistant at Ladies Seminary, Honesdale, being appointed head around 1842 and holding that post until 1846.  In 1844 she spent one term at Troy Female Seminary, New York.  Also in 1844 she married Horace Hyde Tracey, with whom she had two children.

In 1848 her husband died.  From around 1849-51 she ran a private school at Honesdale, from then until about 1856 she was associated with the academy there.  Between 1856 and 1859 she ran another private school at Neenah, Wisconsin.

In 1859 she was appointed matron in charge of domestic arrangements, head of the ladies department and teacher at Ripon College.  She studied the local flora for almost thirty years, publishing her Catalogue in 1889, based entirely on specimens collected by her or her students.

In 1893 she retired, buying a house off-campus, but continued tutoring and retained her association with Ripon College up to her death in 1905.

Works
  26 pages.

References

1818 births
1905 deaths
American women botanists
People from Susquehanna County, Pennsylvania
19th-century American botanists
20th-century American botanists
19th-century American women scientists
Emma Willard School alumni
20th-century American women scientists